South West District was a district command of the British Army between 1967 and 1995.

History

The district was formed from 43rd (Wessex) Infantry Division as part of the Territorial Army Volunteer Reserve in 1967. It had its headquarters at Bulford Camp, Wiltshire, and was placed under the command of HQ United Kingdom Land Forces in 1972. 

In 1984-85 the district controlled a number of individual units, including 94th Locating Regiment, Royal Artillery at Roberts Barracks, Larkhill; the Support Regiment RA; Headquarters 7 Regiment Army Air Corps; the UK contingent of the ACE Mobile Force; 1st Infantry Brigade at Tidworth; 43 Wessex Brigade in Exeter; and five planned companies of the Home Service Force.

In 1992, Headquarters South West District controlled three of the Army's 20 training areas on Salisbury Plain.

The district was disbanded on the formation of HQ Land Command in 1995.

Commanders
General officers commanding included:
1967–1970 Major-General Thomas Acton
1970–1971 Major-General John Douglas-Withers
1972–1974 Major-General Hugh Cunningham
1974–1975 Major-General George Cooper
1975–1978 Major-General Robert Lyon
1978–1981 Major-General Sir John Acland
1981–1984 Major-General Michael Gray
1984–1987 Major-General Barry Lane
1987–1990 Major-General Anthony Jeapes
1990–1992 Major-General Anthony Pollard

See also 

 Headquarters South West (United Kingdom)

References

Districts of the British Army
Military units and formations established in 1967
Military units and formations disestablished in 1992